The  is a railway line in Fukuoka Prefecture in Kyushu, Japan. It is the main line of the private railway company Nishi-Nippon Railroad (Nishitetsu). The line connects Nishitetsu Fukuoka (Tenjin) Station in Chūō-ku, Fukuoka with Ōmuta Station in Ōmuta.

Overview 

Track
Double: Nishitetsu Fukuoka (Tenjin) - Shikenjōmae, Daizenji - Kamachi, Hiraki - Ōmuta
Single: the rest

The line runs approximately parallel with to the JR Kyushu Kagoshima Main Line, but connection between the lines are poor.

Operations

Rapid services
The operator Nishitetsu offers two types of limited-stop "Rapid" train services in addition to all-stations "Local" trains.

Stops all stations. Between Nishitetsu Fukuoka (Tenjin) and Chikushi or Daizenji inside the line, Nishitetsu Fukuoka (Tenjin) and Dazaifu of Dazaifu Line, Amagi of Amagi Line and Ōmuta. Trains inside the line and Dazaifu Line with 4-7 car EMUs, through trains to Amagi Line with 2-car 7000 and 7050 series EMUs
 (Ex)
Operated all day. Some Expresses are operated as Locals in southern part (Ōmuta side). In day hours, 2 per hour per direction between Nishitetsu Fukuoka (Tenjin) and Nishitetsu Ogōri, and 2 between Nishitetsu Fukuoka and Hanabatake. Five-car 3000 series EMUs, 6-car 2000 and 5000 series EMUs
 (LE)
Between Nishitetsu Fukuoka (Tenjin) and Ōmuta, 2 service per direction per hour. Seven-car 8000 series in day hours, 5000, 6000 and 6050 series EMUs in the morning and evening hours

Service pattern
During the daytime between 10:00 and 16:00, the numbers of trains per direction per hour are as follows.
Nishitetsu Fukuoka (Tenjin) - Nishitetsu Futsukaichi
2 LE, 4 Ex, 6 Lo
Nishitetsu Futsukaichi - Chikushi
2 LE, 4 Ex, 4 Lo
Chikushi - Nishitetsu Ogōri
2 LE, 2 Ex, 2 Lo (north of Chikushi as Ex), 2 Lo
Nishitetsu Ogōri - Miyanojin
2 LE, 2 Ex, 2 Lo
Miyanojin - Hanabatake
2 LE, 2 Ex, 2 Lo, 2 Lo through to Amagi Line
Hanabatake - Daizenji
2 Lo, 4 Lo
Daizenji - Ōmuta
2 LE, 2 Lo

Stations 
All stations are located in Fukuoka Prefecture.
lower case shows some trains stop
e1: Expresses only for Chikushi stop
e2: Expresses only down for Nishitetsu Ogōri, some ups from Hanabatake, Shikenjōmae, Tsubuku, Nishitetsu Yanagawa stop

Rolling stock
New three- and two-car 9000 series electric multiple unit trains were introduced on the line from March 2017.

History 

The  built and operated the first Interurban railway line in Kyushu from Fukuoka, planned to extend to Kumamoto, but difficulty in securing a corridor south of Omuta resulted in that plan being abandoned.

12 April 1924: Fukuoka (presently Nishitetsu Fukuoka (Tenjin)) - Kurume (presently Nishitetsu Kurume) opened by the Kyushu Railway (II). 1,435mm gauge, electrified, double tracked.
28 December 1932: Kurume - Tsubuku opened, single tracked.
22 June 1937: The Ōkawa Railway was merged into the Kyushu Railway. Kamikurume - Tsubuku - Daizenji - Enokizu became a part of Kūshū Railway network, single tracked,  gauge.
Daizenji - Yanagawa (presently Nishitetsu Yanagawa) opened.
1 December 1938: Fukuoka - Tsubuku from Tram Act to Local Railway Act.
1 September 1938: Yanagawa - Nakashima (presently Nishitetsu Nakashima) opened.
1 October 1938: Nakashima - Sakaemachi (presently Shin-Sakaemachi) opened.
1 July 1939: Sakaemachi - Ōmuta opened, the line completed.
19 September 1942:  merged, under wartime condition, Kyushu Railway and some other railway companies in Fukuoka Prefecture.
22 September 1942: Kyushu Electric Tramway renamed Nishi-Nippon Railroad, the line became its Ōmuta Line.
11 November 1951: Nishitetsu Kurume - Shikenjōmae track doubled.
20 March 1960: Kuranaga - Nishitetsu Ginsui track doubled.
April 1961: Nishitetsu Ginsui - Sakaemachi track doubled.
21 June 1961: Sakaemachi -. Ōmuta track doubled.
20 November 1965: Hiraki - Kuranaga track doubled.
February, 1967: Daizenji - Mizuma, Ōmizo - Kamachi track doubled.
10 June 1974: CTC signalling is commissioned on the entire line.
15 January 1997: Mizuma - Ōmizo track doubled.
1 January 2001: Proper names changed to Tenjin-Ōmuta Line from Ōmuta Line, Nishitetsu Fukuoka (Tenjin) Station (with Tenjin in parentheses) from Nishitetsu Fukuoka Station.
16 February 2008: The maximum speed on the line is increased from 100 km/h to 110 km/h.
27 March 2010:  and  services were discontinued.
28 August 2022: The section between Zasshonokuma and Shimoōri stations was elevated, resulting in the removal of several level crossings.

External Links
 Cab-view video of a limited express Fukuoka to Omuta train

Footnotes

References
This article incorporates material from the corresponding article in the Japanese Wikipedia.

 
Nishi-Nippon Railroad
Railway lines in Japan
Rail transport in Fukuoka Prefecture
Standard gauge railways in Japan
Railway lines opened in 1924